Devesa is a surname. Notable people with the surname include:

 Didac Devesa (born 1990), Spanish footballer
 Domènec Ruiz Devesa (born 1978), Spanish politician
 Jorge Devesa (born 1988), Spanish footballer
 Susan Shaw Devesa (born 1944), American cancer epidemiologist

See also 

 Devesas Factory Warehouse